Sean Byrne may refer to:

Footballers
 Sean Byrne (footballer) (fl. 1920s and 1930s), Irish Soccer player
 Sean Byrne (New Zealand footballer) (1955–2003), New Zealand international football player

Others
 Sean Byrne (filmmaker), Australian filmmaker
 Sean Byrne (politician) (born 1937), Irish Fianna Fáil politician, TD 1982–1987, Senator 1989–1997
 John "Sean" Byrne (1946–2008), Irish-born American musician

See also
 Sean Burns (disambiguation)
 Shaun Byrne (disambiguation)